The 1987 SEC Men’s Basketball Tournament took place from March 5–8, 1987 at the Omni Coliseum in Atlanta, Georgia. Alabama won the tournament and received the SEC's automatic bid to the NCAA Men’s Division I Basketball tournament by defeating Louisiana State (LSU) by a score of 69–62.

Jefferson-Pilot Teleproductions, in its first season of producing regionally syndicated SEC basketball games, provided television coverage of the first round, the quarterfinals, and the semifinals. Coverage of the championship game was broadcast on ABC through its sports broadcasting division,  ABC Sports.

Bracket

References

 

SEC men's basketball tournament
1986–87 Southeastern Conference men's basketball season
1987 in sports in Georgia (U.S. state)
Basketball competitions in Atlanta
College basketball tournaments in Georgia (U.S. state)